Ihsan Maulana Mustofa (born 18 November 1995) is an Indonesian badminton player who plays in singles event. He is from PB. Djarum, a badminton club in Kudus, Central Java and has joined the club since 2010. He was a boys' singles bronze medalist of the 2013 World Junior Championships that was held in Bangkok, Thailand. He played in the decisive matches for Indonesia to win the team event at the 2015 and 2017 Southeast Asian Games.

Career

2012 
Mustofa was the national junior champion in 2012.

2013 
Mustofa was qualified to participate at the 2013 Badminton Asia Championships but his participation just got to the first round after being defeated by Park Sung-min with a rubber games 21–17, 20–22, 10–21. He also played in some international challenge tournaments and BWF Grand Prix such as Vietnam Open and Indonesian Grand Prix Gold. He reached the second round in both BWF Grand Prix tournaments. In the second round, he was stopped by fellow Indonesian shuttlers. He was upset by Jonatan Christie at the 2013 Vietnam Open with a rubber games and by his senior Dionysius Hayom Rumbaka at the 2013 Indonesian Grand Prix Gold with a straight games. In November 2013, he brought home a bronze medal during the 2013 BWF World Junior Championships in Bangkok, Thailand after being defeated by South Korean shuttler Heo Kwang-hee with a rubber games 18–21, 21–13, 16–21 in the semifinals.

2014 
Mustofa was selected to join the national team as the youngest player in the Thomas Cup squad; after the Indonesian Badminton Association, quarantined 33 Thomas and Uber Cups candidates at the Djarum Badminton Club in Kudus, Central Java, for a simulation last March 2014. Mustofa defeated Sony Dwi Kuncoro, the 2004 Athens Olympics bronze medalist and the former world number four, with a stunning 21–19, 21–18 performance, catching the coaching staffs' attention. He, in 18-year-old, was dubbed 'the next big thing' by a top badminton official, is part of the Indonesian team that left for New Delhi for the Thomas Cup 2014. He also participated in some international challenge and BWF Grand Prix tournaments. He played at the 2014 German Open and the 2014 Chinese Taipei Open. His best performance in the international individual competitions was when he became the runner-up of the 2014 Dutch Open, beaten by Ajay Jayaram of India with 11–10, 6–11, 7–11, 11–1, 9–11 in the final.

2015 
Mustofa was part of the Indonesian team that left for Dongguan, China for the 2015 Sudirman Cup, which the Indonesia team won the bronze medal at that world mixed team tournament. At the 28th Southeast Asian Games 2015 in Singapore, Mustofa helped the Indonesian men's team beating Thailand 3–2 to bring home a gold medal in the final game after he defeated Suppanyu Avihingsanon from Thailand with 20–22, 21–16, 21–9.

2017 
Mustofa participated in both team and individual event at 29th Southeast Asian Games 2017. He helped the Indonesian men's team retaining the gold medal, beating the Malaysian Lee Zi Jia 21–11, 21–11. He also grabbed the bronze medal in individual event, beaten by Thailand's Khosit Phetpradab in straight game 10–21, 21–23.

2018 
In 2018, Mustofa won the BWF Tour Super 100 Bangka Belitung Indonesia Masters. In the final, he beat Lin Yu-hsien of Chinese Taipei in straight games.

2019 
At the end of 2019, Mustofa announced his resignation from the national team through his Instagram account in October 2019.

Awards and nominations

Achievements

Southeast Asian Games 
Men's singles

BWF World Junior Championships 
Boys' singles

BWF World Tour (1 title, 1 runner-up) 
The BWF World Tour, which was announced on 19 March 2017 and implemented in 2018, is a series of elite badminton tournaments sanctioned by the Badminton World Federation (BWF). The BWF World Tours are divided into levels of World Tour Finals, Super 1000, Super 750, Super 500, Super 300 (part of the HSBC World Tour), and the BWF Tour Super 100.

Men's singles

BWF Grand Prix (3 runners-up) 
The BWF Grand Prix had two levels, the Grand Prix and Grand Prix Gold. It was a series of badminton tournaments sanctioned by the Badminton World Federation (BWF) and played between 2007 and 2017.

Men's singles

  BWF Grand Prix Gold tournament
  BWF Grand Prix tournament

Participation at Indonesian team 
 3 times at Thomas Cup (2014, 2016, 2018)
 2 times at Sudirman Cup (2015, 2017)
 2 times at Asian Games (2014, 2018)
 2 times at Southeast Asian Games (2015, 2017)

Performance timeline

National team 
 Junior level

 Senior level

Individual competitions 
 Junior level

 Senior level

Record against selected opponents 
Head to head (H2H) against World Superseries finalists, World Championships semifinalists, and Olympic quarterfinalists.

  Lin Dan 1–4
  Shi Yuqi 0–1
  Tian Houwei 0–3
  Wang Zhengming 0–1
  Chou Tien-chen 0–1
  Hans-Kristian Vittinghus 0–1
  Jan Ø. Jørgensen 0–1
  Marc Zwiebler 2–0
  Hu Yun 1–0
  Ng Ka Long 0–2
  Anthony Sinisuka Ginting 1–1
  Jonatan Christie 1–3
  Simon Santoso 0–1
  Tommy Sugiarto 0–1
  Ajay Jayaram 0–1
  Sameer Verma 0–1
  Srikanth Kidambi 1–1
  Kazumasa Sakai 1–0
  Kenichi Tago 2–0
  Kenta Nishimoto 2–0
  Kento Momota 0–2
  Jeon Hyeok-jin 1–0
  Lee Hyun-il ''0–2
  Son Wan-ho 2–0
  Lee Chong Wei 0–1
  Liew Daren 0–1
  Tanongsak Saensomboonsuk 1–1

References

External links 

 

1995 births
Living people
People from Tasikmalaya
Sportspeople from West Java
Indonesian male badminton players
Badminton players at the 2014 Asian Games
Badminton players at the 2018 Asian Games
Asian Games silver medalists for Indonesia
Asian Games medalists in badminton
Medalists at the 2018 Asian Games
Competitors at the 2015 Southeast Asian Games
Competitors at the 2017 Southeast Asian Games
Southeast Asian Games gold medalists for Indonesia
Southeast Asian Games bronze medalists for Indonesia
Southeast Asian Games medalists in badminton
21st-century Indonesian people